Larisa Virginia Hovannisian (born 21 October 1988) is an Armenian-American social entrepreneur and founder of Teach For Armenia.

Education 

Hovannisian is a graduate of St. Norbert College, a liberal arts college in De Pere, Wisconsin and Arizona State University’s Mary Lou Fulton Teachers College.

Career 

In 2013, Hovannisian founded Teach For Armenia, a social impact organization with a mission to catalyze a movement of impact-driven leaders expanding educational opportunity to all children in Armenia. Teach For Armenia is the 36th partner of Teach For All, a global education network dedicated to expanding educational opportunities in countries around the world.

Music 

In 2015 Hovannisian recorded an Armenian lullaby, "Ari Im Sokhag", with Serj Tankian, the lead vocalist of Grammy Award winning rock band System of A Down. The song became the soundtrack of the film 1915, a psychological thriller about the Armenian genocide.

References

1988 births
Living people
American people of Armenian descent
People from Yerevan
Armenian people of American descent
Armenian people of Irish descent
Teach For America alumni